During Easter Sunday and Monday in 2020 (April 12–13), a large and destructive tornado outbreak occurred across the Southern and Eastern United States. The total number of tornadoes confirmed from the outbreak is 141 over the course of 37 hours and 24 minutes.

Confirmed tornadoes

April 12 event

April 13 event

See also
Tornadoes of 2020
List of United States tornadoes in April 2020
List of tornadoes and tornado outbreaks

Notes

References

2020-04-12
Tornadoes of 2020
2020 natural disasters in the United States
2020-related lists
April 2020 events in the United States